The Fortier River is a tributary of the north shore of the Panache River flowing in Eeyou Istchee James Bay (municipality), in Jamésie, in the administrative region of Nord-du-Québec, Quebec, Canada.

This river successively crosses the townships of Urban and Carpiquet.

Forestry is the main economic activity of the sector; recreational tourism activities, second. The Fortier River valley is served by the R1051 forest road (east-west), which runs north.

The surface of the Fortier River is usually frozen from early November to mid-May, however, safe ice circulation is generally from mid-November to mid-April.

Geography

Toponymy 
At various times in history, this territory has been occupied by the Attikameks, the Algonquins and the Crees. The term "Fortier" is a family name of French origin.

The toponym "Fortier River" was officialized on December 5, 1968, at the Commission de toponymie du Québec, when it was created.

See also 

 List of rivers of Quebec

Notes and references 

Rivers of Nord-du-Québec
Nottaway River drainage basin